Sheshequin may refer to:

Sheshequin, Pennsylvania
Sheshequin Township, Bradford County, Pennsylvania